Juan Escobedo is an actor, director and photographer who was born and raised in San Diego, California, US.

In 2007 Escobedo portrayed and directed a troubled war veteran in the short film Soy Soldado de Irak. The film  generated numerous awards including the Swiss Cultural Program's Best Film Award at the Cannes Film Festival (2008), and the Cinema of Conscience Award from the Sonoma Valley Film Festival (2008). It was most recently nominated for the prestigious Imagen Award (2009), which honors positive portrayals of Latinos in film and television. His other directorial work include Ruby, a film for Current TV. In 2018, Escobedo's other film Marisol, a short film that deals with the horrors of domestic violence and child abuse won the Best Dramatic Short at the Hollywood Reel Independent Film Festival and Best Actress Awards for both leading Actresses at the Women's Independent Film Festival and the Playhouse West Film Festival. Marisol script was also inducted into the Academy of Motion Picture Arts and Sciences (AMPAS)  Margaret Herrick Library permanent collection made available to researchers.

Photography 
The Los Angeles Department of Cultural Affairs (DCA) started publishing Juan Escobedo's photography in 2012 as part of the City of Los Angeles Heritage Month Celebrations which dates back to 1949 when Mayor Fletcher Bowron issued a proclamation to recognize African American Heritage Month.  Over time, the city has elected to celebrate various heritage months consistent with federally designated monthly observances. Many cities celebrate residents’ cultural heritage during these federally designated monthly observances.

Trash and Tears is a series of photographs Escobedo started in 2016 in which he photographs actors and models with trash around the city. It attempts to explore the issues of hoarding, mental health, income, graffiti and drug addiction through trash between non and homeless population. It's also a  commentary on the carelessness of people refusing pick up their own trash or recycle. Therefore, accumulating in pockets throughout the city putting additional economic and men power burden on the City of Los Angeles. Oftentimes the photos are taken soon after homelessness encampments are dismantled, leaving personal and treasured belongings behind by homeless which others see as trash.

Nonprofit 
In 2004 Escobedo founded the East Los Angeles Society of Film and Arts (TELASOFA) and the East LA Film Festival. TELASOFA is a non-profit organization dedicated to "Provoking Thought and Inspiring Solutions" for youth who are at risk of substance abuse, HIV/AIDS, early pregnancy and gang involvement

References

 https://culturela.org/programs-and-initiatives/city-of-los-angeles-heritage-month-celebrations/
 http://catalog.oscars.org/vwebv/search?searchArg=Juan+Escobedo&searchCode=GKEY%5E&limitTo=none&recCount=50&searchType=1&page.search.search.button=Search
 https://www.kcet.org/shows/artbound/monterey-park-art-film-lab-a-travelogue-from-the-lacma9-outpost
 http://www.pasadenanow.com/main/hillsides-prevention-specialist-wins-best-dramatic-short-film-at-hollywood-reel-independent-film-festival/#.Wv2M5dMvxp8
 http://www.hispaniclifestyle.com/articles/profile-actor-jose-yenque-honored-with-ilka-humanitarian-award/
 https://web.archive.org/web/20090919051200/http://winecountry.bside.com/2008/films/iamasoldier_winecountry2008
 http://www.variety.com/article/VR1118006177.html?categoryid=13&cs=1
 http://thevoicepub.com/yahoo_site_admin/assets/docs/2009_05_May_Voice_ver_2.127140539.pdf
 http://issuu.com/inographic/docs/fuerzalatina80final
 http://latinola.com/story.php?story=6708
 http://voyagela.com/interview/meet-juan-escobedo-juan-escobedo-los-angeles/?doing_wp_cron=1547917875.3360369205474853515625
 https://coloradoboulevard.net/local-girl-lives-forever-at-the-academy-of-arts-sciences/

External links
 http://www.juanescobedo.com
 https://www.imdb.com/name/nm2513081/
 http://www.imagen.org/awards/2009/nominees
 http://www.icelebz.com/celebs/juan_escobedo/photo1.html

American male film actors
Living people
Male actors from San Diego
Film directors from California
21st-century American male actors
Year of birth missing (living people)